Events from the year 2009 in Taiwan, Republic of China. This year is numbered Minguo 98 according to the official Republic of China calendar.

Incumbents
 President – Ma Ying-jeou
 Vice President – Vincent Siew
 Premier – Liu Chao-shiuan, Wu Den-yih
 Vice Premier – Paul Chiu, Eric Chu

Events

January
 1 January – The official adaptation of Hanyu Pinyin in Taiwan.
 18 January, the government, in more than 14,000 offices in all administrative regions of the country, to every citizen issued a total of 3,600 yuan worth of consumer vouchers per person.()

March
 31 March – The establishment of the Communist Party of the Republic of China.

May
 23–24 May – 2009 Asian Judo Championships in Taipei Arena, Taipei.

July
 4 July – The opening of Neihu Line of Taipei Metro.
 16 July – The inauguration of Taichung LNG Terminal in Wuqi District, Taichung.
 16–26 July – World Games 2009 in Kaohsiung City.
 20 July – The name restoration for Chiang Kai-shek Memorial Hall in Taipei.
 26 July – 2009 Kuomintang chairmanship election.
 27 July – The opening of Qishan Train Station in Kaohsiung County.

August
 7 August – Typhoon Morakot hits Taiwan, killing 500 and stranding more than 1,000 via the worst flooding on the island in half a century.
 19 August – The opening of Taipei Bus Station in Taipei.
 19–22 August – The 4th Taiwan Youth Day.

September
 5–15 September – 2009 Summer Deaflympics in Taipei.
 11 September – The former Taiwanese President Chen Shui-bian received a life sentence and was fined NT$200 million (US$6.13 million) on charges of embezzlement, taking bribes, and money laundering, involving a total of US$15 million (NT$490 million) while in office from 2000 to 2008.  Supporters of Chen contended that the prosecution was politically motivated. Chen is the first ROC president to receive a prison sentence.
 27 September – The opening of Kaohsiung Arena in Kaohsiung.

November
 22 November – The opening of Black Bat Squadron Memorial Hall in East District, Hsinchu City.
 28 November – The establishment of CTi Entertainment.

December
 11 December – The opening of Qsquare in Datong District, Taipei.
 19 December – The 6.4  Hualien earthquake shook the coast of Hualien County with a maximum Mercalli intensity of VI (Strong), causing some damage and 14 injuries.
 20 December – Fourth Chen-Chiang summit in Taichung.

Deaths
 4 January – Hsieh Yue-hsia, 65, actress.
 3 February
Henry Hsu, 96, Chinese-born Taiwanese athlete and politician, MLY (1973–1987), heart failure.
Sheng-yen, 79, Chinese-born Taiwanese Buddhist Zen master, kidney disease.
 7 March – Chan Yun, 93, Taiwanese Buddhist monk and teacher of meditation.
 6 April – A-Sun, 34, Taiwanese singer and songwriter, breast cancer.
 26 August – Lin Hui-kuan, 51, Taiwanese trade unionist and politician, MLY (2002–2008), sepsis.
 12 September  – Danny Pang, 42, Taiwanese-born American hedge fund manager.

References 

 
Years of the 21st century in Taiwan